An election of the Members of the European Parliament from the Netherlands was held on 23 May 2019. It is the ninth time the elections have been held for the European elections in the Netherlands. The number of Dutch seats was to increase from 26 to 29 following Brexit, but due to the extension of the Article 50 process in the United Kingdom, the number of seats to be elected will remain at 26.

Background

Voting and election organisation

Election Planning

Right to vote 
In order to vote, a person must:
 have either the Dutch nationality or the nationality of a European Union member state,
 be 18 years or older, and
 not be otherwise disqualified from voting.

Additionally, nationals of other member states of the European Union must:
 be resident in the Netherlands on the day the candidates are nominated,
 not be disqualified from voting either in the Netherlands or in the Member State in which they are a national, and
 have registered in a municipality declaring that they want to vote in the Netherlands instead of in the home country (by filling out the Y-32 form).

Dutch nationals abroad, as well as in Aruba, Curaçao and Sint Maarten have to register to vote for the elections to the European Parliament. When they register, they must say whether they will vote by post, by proxy, or in person at a polling station in the Netherlands.

Dutch nationals living in another EU member state must make a statement that they have not voted in the member state in which they reside, if they want to vote in the Netherlands.

Dutch residents on Bonaire, St. Eustatius, and Saba have no need to register, because these islands are part of the Netherlands. They are able to vote in person at polling stations on the islands.

Right to stand as a candidate 
In order to stand in the European Parliament election, a candidate must:
 hold either Dutch nationality or the nationality of a Member State of the European Union,
 be at least 18 years of age on the day they would be sworn into the European Parliament, and
 have the right to vote.

Additionally, candidates from other member states of the European Union must:
 be resident in the Netherlands, and
 be able to stand as a candidate in the member state of which they are a national.

Organisation of elections 

In elections for the European Parliament, the national electoral districts play no role in the nomination. The Netherlands consists of a single electoral district. Political parties, therefore, take part in the elections with only a single candidate list.

However, the national electoral districts do play an important role in processing the election results. The principal polling station of each constituency determines the vote total of the constituency. The results of the vote are recorded in an official document and transferred to the Electoral Council. The Electoral Council, in its role as the central electoral committee, then determines the result of the Netherlands' distribution of seats.

Casting a vote 
A voter could cast their vote at a polling station of their choice within their own district. At the casting their vote, they could identify themselves with an identity document which is considered valid even if it has expired within the last five years.

Participation of political groups

Numbering of the candidates list 

The parties which had obtained one or more seats in 2014 at the last election to the European Parliament were given a number based on the number of votes they had received in the previous election. These totalled nine candidate lists. The party with the most votes got number 1 and the rest were listed accordingly. The list numbers for the remaining candidate lists were decided by a lottery.

Common lists 
Parties can form common lists, which means that two or more parties create a single list and stand in the elections as though they were one party. There are two for this election:

Election day 

Traditionally, all elections are held on Wednesday in the Netherlands. However, the European Parliament elections run from Thursday to Sunday across the entire European Union so Thursday was chosen. This is because it is the only day that the Dutch Government believes is appropriate for an election day due to it not being a rest day for any religion. Sunday is not an option because it is a rest day for Christians, while it is the Sabbath on Friday and Saturday.

Polls

Exit Poll 
An exit poll carried out by Ipsos, as well as a forecast of the result produced by GeenPeil and Maurice de Hond based on a part of results collected, indicated that the Labour Party (PvdA) emerged with the most seats, followed by the Christian Democratic Appeal (CDA) and People's Party for Freedom and Democracy (VVD) with four seats each, Forum for Democracy (FvD) and GroenLinks (GL) with three seats and the Democrats 66 (D66) and the Christian Union – Reformed Political Party (CU-SGP) lists with two seats each, with all others on zero or one seat. The result marked the first time the Labour Party had won the most seats of the EU Parliament in the Netherlands since 1984, and the first time it has won the popular vote in a Dutch election since 1998.

Poll

Seats

Vote share

Results

Voter turnout was 41.93%, higher than in 2014 (37.32%), and higher than any European Parliament election in the past twenty years.

Seat assignment

Electoral quota
The electoral quota is the number of votes needed for one seat. It is the total valid number of votes divided by the number of seats. For this election it was 5,497,813 valid votes, divided by 26 seats. The electoral quota was established as 211,454.

Assigning full seats
Full seats are assigned by number of votes divided by the electoral quota. Electoral alliances are marked as a letter, instead of a number. Any seats left over are not yet assigned to a specific party.

Remainder seats
The remaining, or left over, seats are awarded sequentially to the lists with the highest average number of votes per seat. Only lists that reached the electoral quota are eligible.

 P.v.d.A./European Social Democrats is awarded 2 seats
 VVD is awarded 1 seat
 Forum for Democracy is awarded 1 seat
 GreenLeft is awarded 1 seat
 Democrats 66 (D66) - ALDE is awarded 1 seat
 Christian Union-SGP is awarded 1 seat
 CDA - European People's Party is awarded 1 seat

European groups

| style="text-align:center;" colspan="11" | 
|-
|style="background-color:#E9E9E9;text-align:center;vertical-align:top;" colspan="3"|European group
!style="background-color:#E9E9E9" |Seats 2014
!style="background-color:#E9E9E9" |Seats 2019
!style="background-color:#E9E9E9" |Change
!style="background-color:#E9E9E9" |Seats(after Brexit)
!style="background-color:#E9E9E9" |Change(after Brexit
|-
| 
| style="text-align:left;" | Renew Europe
| style="text-align:left;" | RE
| style="text-align:right;" | 7
| style="text-align:right;" | 6
| style="text-align:right;" | 1 
| style="text-align:right;" | 7
| style="text-align:right;" | 1 
|-
| 
| style="text-align:left;" | Progressive Alliance of Socialists and Democrats
| style="text-align:left;" | S&D
| style="text-align:right;" | 3
| style="text-align:right;" | 6
| style="text-align:right;" | 3 
| style="text-align:right;" | 6
| style="text-align:right;" | 0 
|-
| 
| style="text-align:left;" | European People's Party
| style="text-align:left;" | EPP
| style="text-align:right;" | 5
| style="text-align:right;" | 6
| style="text-align:right;" | 1 
| style="text-align:right;" | 6
| style="text-align:right;" | 0 
|-
| 
| style="text-align:left;" | European Conservatives and Reformists
| style="text-align:left;" | ECR
| style="text-align:right;" | 2
| style="text-align:right;" | 4
| style="text-align:right;" | 2 
| style="text-align:right;" | 5
| style="text-align:right;" | 1 
|-
| 
| style="text-align:left;" | The Greens–European Free Alliance
| style="text-align:left;" | Greens-EFA
| style="text-align:right;" | 2
| style="text-align:right;" | 3
| style="text-align:right;" | 1 
| style="text-align:right;" | 3
| style="text-align:right;" | 0 
|-
| 
| style="text-align:left;" | European United Left–Nordic Green Left
| style="text-align:left;" | EUL-NGL
| style="text-align:right;" | 3
| style="text-align:right;" | 1
| style="text-align:right;" | 2 
| style="text-align:right;" | 1
| style="text-align:right;" | 0 
|-
| 
| style="text-align:left;" | Identity and Democracy
| style="text-align:left;" | ID
| style="text-align:right;" | 4
| style="text-align:right;" | 0
| style="text-align:right;" | 4 
| style="text-align:right;" | 1
| style="text-align:right;" | 1 
|-
|width="350" style="text-align:right;background-color:#E9E9E9" colspan="3"|
|width="30" style="text-align:right;background-color:#E9E9E9"| 26
|width="30" style="text-align:right;background-color:#E9E9E9"| 26
|width="30" style="text-align:right;background-color:#E9E9E9"| 0 
|width="30" style="text-align:right;background-color:#E9E9E9"| 29
|width="30" style="text-align:right;background-color:#E9E9E9"| 3 
|}

Elected members
To be elected by preference votes, 10% of the electoral quota is needed. The electoral quota was 211,454. 10% of 211,454 = 21,145 votes.

36 members were directly elected by preference votes. Not all candidates could be appointed because either the party did not get enough seats, or it got no seats.

Below are all the elected members of European parliament for the Netherlands. The following 26 MEPs were officially announced by the Central Electoral Commission. Members elected by preference votes are in bold.

P.v.d.A./European Social Democrats
 Frans Timmermans, by 839,240 votes
 Agnes Jongerius, by 109,987 votes
 Kati Piri, by 29,475 votes
 Paul Tang, by 8,497 votes
 Vera Tax, by 12,760 votes
 Mohammed Chahim, by 2,825 votes

VVD
 Malik Azmani, by 365,155 votes
 Caroline Nagtegaal-van Doorn, by 163,279 votes
 Jan Huitema, by 115,738 votes
 Liesje Schreinemacher, by 37,519 votes

CDA – European People's Party
 Esther de Lange, by 402,975 votes
 Annie Schreijer-Pierik, by 113,914 votes
 Jeroen Lenaers, by 50,121 votes
 Tom Berendsen, by 28,579 votes

Forum for Democracy
 Derk Jan Eppink, by 339,988 votes
 Thierry Baudet, by 164,711 votes
 Rob Roos, by 41,323 votes

GreenLeft
 Bas Eickhout, by 263,034 votes
 Tineke Strik, by 149,628 votes
 Kim van Sparrentak, by 32,505 votes

Democrats 66 (D66) – ALDE
 Sophie in 't Veld, by 248,383 votes
 Samira Rafaela, by 32,510 votes

Christian Union-SGP
 Peter van Dalen, by 240,459 votes
 Bert-Jan Ruissen, by 44,416 votes

Party for the Animals
 Anja Hazekamp, by 136,224 votes

50PLUS
 Toine Manders, by 127,228 votes

Members not elected, but enough preference votes:
 D66 - Raoul Boucke, by 22,500 votes
 VVD - Bart Groothuis, by 21,353 votes
 Christian Union-SGP - Anja Haga, by 37,813 votes
 GreenLeft - Sabine Klok, by 26,949 votes
 GreenLeft - Eline van Nistelrooij, by 26,250 votes
 50PLUS - Emmy van der Kleij, by 24,723 votes
 PVV - Geert Wilders, by 83,448 votes
 PVV - Marcel de Graaff, by 81,073 votes
 SP - Arnout Hoekstra, by 93,809 votes
 SP - Jannie Visscher, by 35,498 votes
 DENK - Ayhan Tonca, by 25,302 votes
 Volt Netherlands - Reinier van Lanschot, by 51,621 votes
 Volt Netherlands - Nilüfer Vogels, by 21,951 votes

MEPs in 2019–2024
Below is a list of members of the European Parliament for the period 2019–2024 as a result of this election.

Mutations

2019
 23 May: Election for the European Parliament in the Netherlands.
 6 June: Forum for Democracy joins the ECR Group.
 11 June: The election committee elecs Rob Rooken for the empty seat of Thierry Baudet in the European Parliament, because Thierry Baudet did not accept the seat. He has 28 days to accept or reject.
 12 June: Alliance of Liberals and Democrats for Europe group (ALDE group) becomes Renew Europe.
 12 June: Europe of Nations and Freedom (ENF Group) becomes Identity and Democracy.
 19 June: The Christen Union leaves the ECR group and wants to join the EPP group.
 19 June: 50PLUS joins the EPP group.
 2 July: Beginning of the 9th European Parliament session (2019–2024).
 2 July: Frans Timmermans from the Labour Party did not accept his seat.
 8 July: The election committee elecs Lara Wolters for the empty seat of Frans Timmermans in the European Parliament, because Frans Timmermans did not accept the seat. She has 28 days to accept or reject.
 9 July: Lara Wolters is installed in the European Parliament as a replacement for Frans Timmermans of the Labour Party.

References

Netherlands
European Parliament elections in the Netherlands
European